Özüdoğru is a Turkish surname formed by the combination of the two Turkish words öz ("gist; kernel") and doğru ("true; right") and may refer to:

 Abdurrahim Özüdoğru (1952–2001), Turkish German machinist and murder victim
 Şefik Avni Özüdoğru (1884–1960), officer of the Ottoman Army and of the Turkish Army
 Talat Avni Özüdoğru (1880–1939), military officer of the Ottoman Army

References

Turkish-language surnames